The Turn of a Card is a 1918 American silent comedy film directed by Oscar Apfel and starring J. Warren Kerrigan, Lois Wilson and Eugene Pallette.

Cast
 J. Warren Kerrigan as Jimmie Montgomery Farrell
 Lois Wilson as Cynthia Burdette
 Eugene Pallette as Eddie Barrett
 William Conklin as William Phelps
 David Hartford as 'Ace High' Burdette
 Frank Clark as Finnegan
 Clifford Alexander as 'Curio' Johnson
 Elinor Fair as Millie Jarvis
 Roy Laidlaw as Mr. Marvis
 Albert R. Cody as Slavin
 Wallace Worsley as John Hays Cotton

References

Bibliography
 Rainey, Buck. Sweethearts of the Sage: Biographies and Filmographies of 258 actresses appearing in Western movies. McFarland & Company, 1992.

External links
 

1918 films
1918 comedy films
1910s English-language films
American silent feature films
Silent American comedy films
American black-and-white films
Films directed by Oscar Apfel
Films distributed by W. W. Hodkinson Corporation
1910s American films